Peculator verconis is a species of sea snail, a marine gastropod mollusk in the family Volutomitridae.

Description
The size of the shell attains 12 mm.

Distribution
This marine species is endemic to Australia and occurs off New South Wales and Victoria.

References

 Iredale, T. 1924. Results from Roy Bell's molluscan collections. Proceedings of the Linnean Society of New South Wales 49(3): 179–279, pls 33–36 
 Cernohorsky, W.O. 1970. Systematics of the families Mitridae & Volutomitridae (Mollusca: Gastropoda). Bulletin of the Auckland Institute and Museum. Auckland, New Zealand 8: 1–190
 Wilson, B. 1994. Australian Marine Shells. Prosobranch Gastropods. Kallaroo, WA : Odyssey Publishing Vol. 2 370 pp. 
 Bouchet P. & Kantor Y. 2004. New Caledonia: the major centre of biodiversity for volutomitrid molluscs (Mollusca: Neogastropoda: Volutomitridae). Systematics and Biodiversity 1(4): 467–502

External links
  Beechey, D. 2003. Peculator verconis Iredale, 1924
 

Volutomitridae
Gastropods of Australia
Gastropods described in 1924